On Monday January 15, 2018, two suicide bombings took place at al-Tayaran Square of Baghdad, killing 36 people and injuring more than 105 others, attacks later claimed by the jihadist group Islamic State (IS).

Attacks
On Monday January 15, 2018, two suicide bombings took place at al-Tayaran Square of Baghdad, killing 36 people and injuring more than 105 others. The attackers struck during rush hour in the city's Tayran Square, which is usually crowded by laborers seeking work. No group immediately claimed responsibility for the attack but it bore all the hallmarks of the Islamic State group, which has claimed many such attacks in the past.

Responsibility claim
Two days later (on Wednesday January 17, 2018) the jihadist group Islamic State (IS) "claimed responsibility for the twin suicide bombings in Baghdad this week", though the New York Times suggested that the delay, and a number of errors in the claim, may show that the group's "media apparatus has been disrupted".
According to the New York Times, which relied on a translation of the IS statement provided by SITE Intelligence Group, the IS claim's errors included that the attack "had occurred at Aden Square in Baghdad, where the police said an attack was foiled on Saturday, rather than in Tayaran Square, where Monday’s explosions took place", and that IS "said that there were three attackers, not two ... and said that the first two detonated their explosive vests in quick succession, while the third hit another gathering in the same area sometime after the first two explosions". IS referred to "the open-air market that was attacked as a gathering of 'rafidha' and of 'polytheists', two words they use to refer to Shiite Muslims in a derogatory manner".

References

2018 murders in Iraq
Suicide bombings in 2018
Islamic State insurgency in Iraq (2017–present)
21st-century mass murder in Iraq
2010s in Baghdad
ISIL terrorist incidents in Iraq
Islamic terrorist incidents in 2018
January 2018 crimes in Asia
Mass murder in 2018
Mass murder in Iraq
Suicide car and truck bombings in Iraq
Suicide bombings in Baghdad
2018-01
Terrorist incidents in Iraq in 2018